is a dam in Asakura, Fukuoka Prefecture, Japan. The dam was completed in 1972.

References 

Dams in Fukuoka Prefecture
Dams completed in 1972